Richland is a borough in Lebanon County, Pennsylvania. It is part of the Lebanon, Pennsylvania metropolitan statistical area. The population was 1,490 at the 2020 census.

Geography
Richland is located at  (40.357122, -76.257187).

Demographics

As of the 2000 census, there were 1,508 people, 582 households, and 444 families residing in the borough. The population density was 965.7 people per square mile (373.2/km²). There were 602 housing units at an average density of 385.5 per square mile (149.0/km²). The racial makeup of the borough was 98.21% White, 0.33% African American, 0.33% Asian, 0.33% from other races, and 0.80% from two or more races. Hispanic or Latino of any race were 0.60% of the population.

There were 582 households, out of which 32.8% had children under the age of 18 living with them, 66.0% were married couples living together, 6.0% had a female householder with no husband present, and 23.7% were non-families. 19.8% of all households were made up of individuals, and 10.5% had someone living alone who was 65 years of age or older. The average household size was 2.59 and the average family size was 2.96.

In the borough, the population was spread out, with 25.1% under the age of 18, 6.6% from 18 to 24, 29.4% from 25 to 44, 22.5% from 45 to 64, and 16.4% who were 65 years of age or older. The median age was 38 years. For every 100 females there were 97.4 males. For every 100 females age 18 and over, there were 93.5 males.

The median income for a household in the borough was $45,729, and the median income for a family was $52,063. Males had a median income of $35,208 versus $22,723 for females. The per capita income for the borough was $19,365. About 2.3% of families and 3.2% of the population were below the poverty line, including 2.7% of those under age 18 and 6.0% of those age 65 or over.

History
Richland is unusual in that an active railroad crossing intersects the town square. Further, the two streets that comprise the square, Main Street and Race Street, are the only streets linking the northern and southern portions of the borough. As a result, that crossing can divide the entire town. This quirk has earned Richland mention in Ripley's Believe It or Not! books and on the televised game show, Jeopardy!.

Notable people 
Nicholas Moehlmann, former Pennsylvania State Representative
Peter Zug, former Pennsylvania State Representative

References

1906 establishments in Pennsylvania
Boroughs in Lebanon County, Pennsylvania
Populated places established in 1906